Beta-centractin is a protein that in humans is encoded by the ACTR1B gene.

This gene encodes a 42.3 kD subunit of dynactin, a macromolecular complex consisting of 10 subunits ranging in size from 22 to 150 kD. Dynactin binds to both microtubules and cytoplasmic dynein. It is involved in a diverse array of cellular functions, including ER-to-Golgi transport, the centripetal movement of lysosomes and endosomes, spindle formation, chromosome movement, nuclear positioning, and axonogenesis. This subunit, like ACTR1A, is an actin-related protein. These two proteins are of equal length and share 90% amino acid identity. They are present in a constant ratio of approximately 1:15 in the dynactin complex.

References

Further reading

External links
 
 

Human proteins